Benny Janssen is a retired Dutch sidecarcross rider and the 1990 World Champion, which he won on a Honda-EML, together with his passenger Tiny Janssen.

The year after his World Championship triumph he has also won the Dutch national sidecarcross championship, riding with his most regular passenger throughout his career, Frans Geurts van Kessel.

Biography
Benny Janssen first entered the Sidecarcross World Championship in 1982 with Frans Geurts van Kessel as his passenger, competing in the Dutch and Belgian Grand Prix and earning three points from those two appearances. The following season Janssen used two passengers during his World Championship campaign, van Kessel and Henk van Heek, and earned 39 points all season, finishing in tenth place overall.

The next two season he exclusively combined with van Kessel again and the pair finished eighth and sixth. In 1986 the team came sixth once more, in a season where Janssen also briefly used 1981 World Champion Frits Kiggen as his passenger. The following year Janssen and van Kessel finished fourth in the competition, but slipped to tenth in 1988. The 1989 season saw the pairs best result so far, finishing second in the World Championship, 26 points behind champions Christoph and Andreas Hüsser.

Janssen started the 1990 season with van Kessel as his passenger once more but switched to Tiny Janssen after two Grand Prix. The new combination performed well, eventually taking out the World Championship with a 13-point gap from Germans Michael Garhammer and Ralf Haas.

The 1991 season saw Janssen compete in the World Championship for the last time, using four different passengers during the season, Epe Willems, Tiny Janssen, Ron Varga and van Kessel. With the later two he also took out the Dutch national championship. In this event, he beat 1991 and 1992 World Champions Eimbert Timmermans and Eric Verhagen by three points while he finished his last World Championship campaign in sixth place. After this season Janssen retired from both the World and the Dutch Championship.

Racing record

Sidecarcross World Championship
Benny Janssen 's results in the Sidecarcross World Championship were:.

Honours

World Championship
 Champions: (1) 1990
 Runners-up: (1) 1989

Netherlands
 Dutch national championship: 
 Champions: (1) 1991
 Runners-up: (1) 1984

References

External links
 The World Championship on Sidecarcross.com

Living people
Dutch sidecarcross riders
Year of birth missing (living people)